Memorial Hall School was a nonsectarian private school in Houston, Texas, which was located in the Spring Branch district from 1966-2022. Originally a K-12 school, Memorial Hall later became available only for students grades 4-12. MHS was designed as an alternative to public school for students who preferred academic individualization, and intentionally utilized small classroom spaces for students to reach their full potential. The school was fully-accredited by the Southern Association of Colleges and Schools and the Texas Education Agency.

History
The school began operations in 1966 under the direction of Donna W. Aurich. Her husband, Rev. George Aurich, started the high school portion serving as the headmaster, and the first senior class graduated in 1975 when the high school population totaled 185 students. At this time the lower school population surpassed 300. In 1987, MHS opened the Reserve Ranch (RR Reserve Ranch), an equestrian ranch outside Conroe, Texas, as a rural weekday boarding program. Memorial Hall received international (I-20) status in 1988.

Following multiple campus relocations, Memorial Hall School closed following the 2021-22 school year. The formal announcement cited declining enrollment numbers and other difficulties pertaining to the COVID-19 pandemic.

Campuses
Memorial Hall School resided on six separate campuses in the fifty-six years it operated. The original location was started by Donna W. Aurich in an office building. The first separate physical campus was at 9002 Ruland Road. The second campus, 3911 Campbell Road, first housed only the high school portion as of 1975 while the lower school continued to operate at the Ruland campus, though the lower and upper schools would later consolidate at Campbell. Another school, Greater Houston Adventist Academy, occupied the 3911 Campbell Road campus from 1986-2000. MHS resided at 3721 Dacoma Street from 1986-2010. The 1.75-acre, 26,000 square-foot facility received over $1 million in donations from the Quaker Oats Company. In 2010, the Dacoma Road campus facilities were purchased by Gateway Academy, a private middle and high school for students with high-functioning autism. Later campuses were at 5400 Mitchelldale Street and 2501 Central Parkway, the latter of which they occupied from 2015 until closing in 2022.

Reserve Ranch
In December 1987, Memorial Hall School opened the forty-acre Reserve (RR) Ranch. Located right outside Conroe, Texas, the ranch provided after-school and weekend boarding options for students whose parents lived a great distance from Houston. The facility also offered outdoor activities and study programs. The entire land, located on League Line Road, was sold in 2005.

Athletics
The Memorial Hall athletic teams were known as the Cougars. MHS had football and boys basketball teams in the 1970s and 1980s. The football team was subjected to infamy when, on September 29, 1978, they gave up 599 rushing yards to a single player, a then-Texas high school football record, in an 85-22 loss to Marian Christian School.

Alumni

 Getoar Mjeku (2006) - Deputy Minister of Economy of Kosovo

Former Staff Members

 George Rice (Football Coach, Principal, AD)
 Joe Robb (Athletic Director)

References

Private high schools in Houston
Educational institutions established in 1966
1966 establishments in Texas
2022 disestablishments in Texas
Defunct schools in Texas